M'baye is both a given name and a surname. Notable people with the name include:

 Aboubacar M'Baye Camara (born 1985), Guinean footballer
 Malick M'Baye
 Souleymane M'baye (born 1975), professional boxer

See also
 Baye (disambiguation)
 Mbaye (disambiguation)